Jean Benoît Vincent Barré (Seine-Port, Seine-et-Marne, 22 January 1735 - Seine-Port, 27 January 1824) was a French architect.  He was one of the most important architects of the 18th century and one of the creators of the 'Louis XVI style' of architecture.

Biography
Jean Benoît Vincent Barré learned architecture in the school of Antoine Matthieu Le Carpentier, from whom he also derived part of his clientele. He worked for very rich patrons, erecting sumptuous and elegant buildings, perfectly fitted to the taste of the day. His career nevertheless remains relatively unknown. He worked for financiers like Laurent Grimod de La Reynière, for whom he built the famous Hôtel Grimod de La Reynière in Paris, Jean-Joseph de Laborde or for Laborde's father-in-law, Mathias de Nettine, banker at the Austrian court. Through Nettine's influence, he was commissioned to build Brussels' Place Royale/Koningsplein, Church of St. James on Coudenberg, and French embassy.

In 1770, Barré was named inspector of the buildings for the king's gunpowder and saltpeter, during which appointment he built his best-known work, the château du Marais (1772–1779), for Jean Le Maître de La Martinière, treasurer-general of the artillery. For Louis Georges Érasme de Contades, maréchal de Contades, he rebuilt the château de Montgeoffroy, in Anjou. Underrated by his fellow architects, only one other backed he is presenting himself to the Royal Academy of Architecture.

In 1772, Barré gave himself over to property speculation in the Nouvelle France quartier of Paris, in association with Jean-François Perrin de Cypierre, intendent of the généralité of Orléans. Later he speculated in association with Antoine Roy, who married Barré's daughter Adélaïde-Sophie in 1793 and had two daughters by her.  (Roy made a great fortune and became finance minister upon the Bourbon Restoration.)

In 1797, Barré retired to his property of La Chesnaye at Seine-Port where he died of old age in 1824.

Main projects
 Château d'Hénonville (Oise), between Pontoise and Beauvais, rebuilt for Jean-Marie Roslin d'Ivry, 1765–1771.
 Château de Montgeoffroy (Maine-et-Loire), 1772–1775, rebuilt for marshal Louis Georges Érasme de Contades.
 Château du Marais (Essonne), main work of the Louis XVI style, 1772–1779.
 Hôtel Grimod de La Reynière, corner of Avenue Gabriel and Rue Boissy d'Anglas, Paris, for Laurent Grimod de La Reynière, 1775 (destroyed).
 Château du Lude (Sarthe), 1785, for the marquess of La Vieuville : Barré realised an important landscaped garden in removing the previous courtyard, building a portico to the western rooms and constructing the wing in the Louis XVI style. To the east, he masked the towers using parallel pavillons with higher roofs than the central pavillon, created a unified facade. The somewhat archaistic allure of this facade also avoids too marked a rupture with the 17th century parts of the building.
For the financier Jean-Joseph de Laborde, Barré created interior decorative schemes and, above all, more of his famous garden landscapes (in collaboration with the painter Hubert Robert) : cenotaph of Cook, rostrum-type column, temple of filial Pietas, Gothic tower, ruined bridge.
 Hôtel Micault d'Harvelay, quartier de la chaussée d'Antin, Paris, for Joseph Micault d'Harvelay, Jean-Joseph de Laborde's father in law (destroyed).
 Hôtel d'Aubeterre, quartier de la chaussée d'Antin, Paris (destroyed).
 Hôtel de Cypierre, 26 rue du Faubourg-Poissonnière, Paris, for Jean-François Perrin de Cypierre (destroyed).
 Hôtel Barré, 24 rue du Faubourg-Poissonnière, Paris, for himself.
 Hôtel de Lalive, rue d’Artois
 Maison de Monsieur Girault, Boulevard de la Chaussée d’Antin
 Hôtel de Laborde, Boulevard des Italiens
 Transformation of the château de Chevilly (Loiret), for Jean-François Perrin de Cypierre.

References

Bibliography
 Michel Gallet, Les architectes parisiens du XVIIIe siècle, Paris, Éditions Mengès, 1995 – 
 Michel Gallet and Gérard Rousset-Charny, « Barré », Macmillan Encyclopedia of Architects, 1982

Notes

1732 births
1824 deaths
French neoclassical architects
18th-century French architects